Highway 333 (AR 333, Ark. 333, and Hwy. 333) is a designation of three north–south state highways in Arkansas. One route begins at US Highway 64 (US 64) and runs north  to Highway 7. A second highway begins at Searcy County Road 8 (CR 8) and runs north to US 65 near Marshall. A third segment connects Gilbert to the state highway system. All three highways were created and modified to their existing alignments between 1965 and 1974, and are maintained by the Arkansas Department of Transportation (ArDOT).

Route description
No segment of Highway 333 has been listed as part of the National Highway System, a network of roads important to the nation's economy, defense, and mobility.

The ArDOT maintains Highway 333 like all other parts of the state highway system. As a part of these responsibilities, it tracks the volume of traffic using its roads in surveys using a metric called average annual daily traffic (AADT). ArDOT estimates the traffic level for a segment of roadway for any average day of the year in these surveys.

London to Dover

The route begins at US 64 at Mill Creek. AR 333 runs west to London before turning north and crossing US 64 and Interstate 40 (I-40). The route runs north and east after I-40, terminating at AR 7 near Dover.

Arkansas Nuclear One

Canaan to Marshall
The route begins at Searcy County Road 8 (CR 8) and runs north to meet AR 27. Near the Searcy County Airport, AR 333 breaks from AR 27 and runs north. The route then meets U.S. Highway 65 (US 65) and AR 74.

Gilbert
A third segment of Highway 333 begins at Frost Street in Gilbert, a small town on the Buffalo National River in Searcy County. It runs north and east to US 65, where it terminates.

As of 2016, the route had an annual average daily traffic (AADT) of 190 vehicles per day (VPD). This AADT classifies Highway 333 as a very low volume local road by American Association of State Highway and Transportation Officials (AASHTO), meaning fewer than 400 vehicles per day.

History
The road existed as a gravel road as early as 1958. By 1964, the gravel road became two disconnected state highway segments, both with the AR 333 designation. By 1983, the two AR 333 segments were connected, and the area east of London was also added. It became a bituminous surface road. The route was paved by 1992.

Major intersections
Mile markers reset at concurrencies.

References

External links

333
Transportation in Pope County, Arkansas
Transportation in Searcy County, Arkansas